Punch, or The London Charivari was a British weekly magazine of humour and satire established in 1841 by Henry Mayhew and wood-engraver Ebenezer Landells. Historically, it was most influential in the 1840s and 1850s, when it helped to coin the term "cartoon" in its modern sense as a humorous illustration. From 1850, John Tenniel was the chief cartoon artist at the magazine for over 50 years.
 
After the 1940s, when its circulation peaked, it went into a long decline, closing in 1992. It was revived in 1996, but closed again in 2002.

History 
Punch was founded on 17 July 1841 by Henry Mayhew and wood-engraver Ebenezer Landells, on an initial investment of £25. It was jointly edited by Mayhew and Mark Lemon. It was subtitled The London Charivari in homage to Charles Philipon's French satirical humour magazine Le Charivari. Reflecting their satiric and humorous intent, the two editors took for their name and masthead the anarchic glove puppet, Mr. Punch, of Punch and Judy; the name also referred to a joke made early on about one of the magazine's first editors, Lemon, that "punch is nothing without lemon". Mayhew ceased to be joint editor in 1842 and became "suggestor in chief" until he severed his connection in 1845. The magazine initially struggled for readers, except for an 1842 "Almanack" issue which shocked its creators by selling 90,000 copies.  In December 1842 due to financial difficulties, the magazine was sold to Bradbury and Evans, both printers and publishers. Bradbury and Evans capitalised on newly evolving mass printing technologies and also were the publishers for Charles Dickens and William Makepeace Thackeray.

Cartoon terminology
Punch humorously appropriated the term to refer to its political cartoons, and the popularity of the Punch cartoons led to the term's widespread use.

Artistry
Illustrator Archibald Henning designed the cover of the magazine's first issues. The cover design varied in the early years, though Richard Doyle designed what became the magazine's masthead in 1849. Artists who published in Punch during the 1840s and 1850s included John Leech,  Doyle, John Tenniel, and Charles Keene. This group became known as "The Punch Brotherhood", which also included Charles Dickens, who joined Bradbury and Evans after leaving Chapman and Hall in 1843. Punch'''s authors and artists also contributed to another Bradbury and Evans literary magazine called Once A Week (est. 1859), created in response to Dickens' departure from Household Words.

Helen Hoppner Coode contributed nineteen drawings to Punch Magazine and is recognised as its first woman contributor.

Liberal competition
In the 1860s and '70s, conservative Punch faced competition from upstart liberal journal Fun, but after about 1874, Fun's fortunes faded. At Evans's café in London, the two journals had "round tables" in competition with each other.

Gaining a market and relations with other papers
After months of financial difficulty and lack of market success, Punch became a staple for British drawing rooms because of its sophisticated humour and absence of offensive material, especially when viewed against the satirical press of the time. The Times and the Sunday paper News of the World used small pieces from Punch as column fillers, giving the magazine free publicity and indirectly granting a degree of respectability, a privilege not enjoyed by any other comic publication. Punch shared a friendly relationship with not only The Times, but  also journals aimed at intellectual audiences such as the Westminster Review, which published a 53-page illustrated article on Punch's first two volumes. Historian Richard Altick writes that "To judge from the number of references to it in the private letters and memoirs of the 1840s...Punch had become a household word within a year or two of its founding, beginning in the middle class and soon reaching the pinnacle of society, royalty itself".

Increasing in readership and popularity throughout the remainder of the 1840s and '50s, Punch was the success story of a threepenny weekly paper that had become one of the most talked-about and enjoyed periodicals. Punch enjoyed an audience including Elizabeth Barrett, Robert Browning, Thomas Carlyle, Edward FitzGerald, Charlotte Brontë, Queen Victoria, Prince Albert, Ralph Waldo Emerson, Emily Dickinson, Herman Melville, Henry Wadsworth Longfellow, and James Russell Lowell. Punch gave several phrases to the English language, including The Crystal Palace, and the "Curate's egg" (first seen in an 1895 cartoon by George du Maurier). Several British humour classics were first serialised in Punch, such as the Diary of a Nobody and 1066 and All That. Towards the end of the 19th century, the artistic roster included Harry Furniss, Linley Sambourne, Francis Carruthers Gould, and Phil May. Among the outstanding cartoonists of the following century were Bernard Partridge, H. M. Bateman, Bernard Hollowood (who also edited the magazine from 1957 to 1968), Kenneth Mahood, and Norman Thelwell.

Circulation broke the 100,000 mark around 1910, and peaked in 1947–1948 at 175,000 to 184,000.  Sales declined steadily thereafter; ultimately, the magazine was forced to close in 2002 after 161 years of publication.Punch was widely emulated worldwide and was popular throughout the British Empire. The experience of Britons in British colonies, especially in India, influenced Punch and its iconography. Tenniel's Punch cartoons of the 1857 Sepoy Mutiny led to a surge in the magazine's popularity. India was frequently caricatured in Punch and was an important source of knowledge on the subcontinent for British readers.

 Later years Punch material was collected in book formats from the late 19th century, which included Pick of the Punch annuals with cartoons and text features, Punch and the War (a 1941 collection of WWII-related cartoons), and A Big Bowl of Punch – which was republished a number of times. Many Punch cartoonists of the late 20th century published collections of their own, partly based on Punch contributions.

In early 1996, businessman Mohamed Al-Fayed bought the rights to the name, and Punch was relaunched later that year.Whack! Whack! Whack! Reborn Punch Pounded Warren Hodge, The New York Times,  18 September 1996. Retrieved 16 March 2013. The new version of the magazine was intended to be a spoiler aimed at Private Eye, which had published many items critical of Fayed. Punch never became profitable in its new incarnation, and at the end of May 2002, it was announced as once more ceasing publication. Press reports quoted a loss of £16 million over the six years of publication, with only 6,000 subscribers at the end.

Whereas the earlier version of Punch prominently featured the clownish character Punchinello (Punch of Punch and Judy) performing antics on front covers, the resurrected Punch did not use the character, but featured on its weekly covers a photograph of a boxing glove, thus informing its readers that the new magazine intended its name to mean "punch" in the sense of a boxing blow.

Punch table
In 2004, much of the archives was acquired by the British Library, including the Punch table.  The long, oval, Victorian table was brought into the offices some time around 1855, and was used for staff meetings and on other occasions.  The wooden surface is scarred with the carved initials of the magazine's longtime writers, artists, and editors, as well as six invited "strangers", including James Thurber and Charles III. Mark Twain declined the invitation, saying that the already-carved initials of William Makepeace Thackeray included his own.

 Gallery of selected early covers 

 Contributors 

Editors

 Mark Lemon (1841–1870)
 Henry Mayhew (1841–1842)
 Charles William Shirley Brooks (1870–1874)
 Tom Taylor (1874–1880)
 Sir Francis Burnand (1880–1906)  
 Sir Owen Seaman (1906–1932)
 E. V. Knox (1932–1949)
 Kenneth Bird (1949–1952)
 Malcolm Muggeridge (1953–1957)
 Bernard Hollowood (1958–1968)
 William Davis (1969–1977)
 Alan Coren (1978–1987)
 David Taylor (1988)
 David Thomas (1989–1992)
 Peter McKay (September 1996 – 1997)
 Paul Spike (1997)
 James Steen (1997–2001)
 Richard Brass (2001–2002)

Cartoonists

Authors

 Influence Punch was influential throughout the British Empire, and in countries including Turkey, India, Japan, and China, with Punch imitators appearing in Cairo, Yokohama, Tokyo, Hong Kong, and Shanghai.Punch gave its name to the Lucknow-based satirical Urdu weekly Awadh Punch (1877–1936), which, in turn, inspired dozens of other "Punch" periodicals in India.
University of Pennsylvania humour magazine the Pennsylvania Punch Bowl derived its name from this magazine.
Australia's Melbourne Punch was inspired by the London original.
Charles Wirgman's Japan Punch (1862–1865, 1865–1887) was based on Punch and went on to inspire elements of modern manga.China Punch, established in 1867 in Hong Kong, was the first humour magazine in greater China. It was followed in 1871 in treaty-port Shanghai by Puck, or the Shanghai CharivariChristopher G. Rea, "‘He’ll Roast All Subjects That May Need the Roasting’: Puck and Mr Punch in Nineteenth-Century China", Asian Punches: A Transcultural Affair, edited by Hans Harder and Barbara Mittler (Berlin: Springer, 2013), pp 389–422.Punch along with founder Henry Mayhew were included in Terry Pratchett's non-Discworld novel Dodger See also 
 Works originally published in Punch magazinePrehistoric Peeps, cartoons by Edward Tennyson Reed.
William Synge

 Notes 

Works cited

 External links 
Mr Punch's Parliamentary Portrait Gallery – UK Parliament Living Heritage
Punch Magazine – Harry Furniss Biography – UK Parliament Living Heritage

 "Punch, or, The London Charivari, 1841". Science in the 19th Century Periodical. Retrieved 29 September 2013 from http://www.sciper.org/browse/PU_desc.html
 
 Punch at Project Gutenberg (plain text and HTML)
 List of Punch volumes currently online
 Hathi Trust. Punch, fulltext
 The History of "Punch" by Marion H. Spielmann, 1895, from Project Gutenberg
 Punch cartoon library, Official site of Punch Limited
 British Cartoon Archive at University of Kent
 John Leech Sketch archives from Punch, site with 600 of Leech's sketches
 Beauty's Lisping Parasite, a Punch article decoded.
 Ariadne In Naxos, a Punch'' cartoon analyzed.
 Searchable archive

 
1841 establishments in the United Kingdom
2002 disestablishments in the United Kingdom
Satirical magazines published in the United Kingdom
Weekly magazines published in the United Kingdom
Punch Magazine
Defunct magazines published in the United Kingdom
Magazines published in London
Magazines established in 1841
Magazines disestablished in 1992
Magazines established in 1996
Magazines disestablished in 2002
Victorian era